The Blue Revolution or Revolución Reconquistadora ("Reconquering Revolution") or Los Azules ("The Blues") was an armed insurrection in the context of the Venezuelan civil wars that took place during the nineteenth century in 1867 and 1868. Through this rebellion, various political and regional groups overthrew President Manuel Ezequiel Bruzual, interim successor of the Marshal Juan Crisóstomo Falcón who had resigned after pressure. These military actions were the conclusion of the long political conflict that confronted various liberal sectors and the Falcón government.

Background 

The causes of the revolution can be traced back to 1864, a year after the liberal victory in the Federal War and the rise to power of Falcón, who had to face strong dissidence from his own movement, which began to arm itself after the public resignation of the Minister of War and Navy Manuel Ezequiel Bruzual, and for more than three years it accumulated political and military leaders within its ranks, many of them highly favored by the government. The first uprisings, which took place within a regional level, were quickly repressed by the government. The central army numbered just 3,000 regulars in 1866, too small to defeat the forces of the regional caudillos.

However, due to the increasingly repressive central administration, insurgent groups began to spread throughout the country in 1867, mainly after the imprisonment of General Manuel Ezequiel Bruzual. This led to an alliance between liberals and conservatives to gain strength as an opposition. In September of that year, a committee of liberals and conservatives was formed in Caracas whose main objective was to overthrow the government. Among its leading members were figures such as Generals Luciano Mendoza and Pedro Ezequiel Rojas, as well as Guillermo Tell Villegas, Elías Rodríguez, Martín J. Sanabria, and José Antonio Mosquera.

Siege of Puerto Cabello 
President Bruzual, unable to defend Caracas, fled with 300 men to Puerto Cabello, where he sought to continue the conflict. There he proclaims himself in exercise of the Presidency of the Republic and enlists troops to face the army sent from Caracas. At the head of the blue army, José Ruperto Monagas began the siege of the city on 6 August 1868 and, on the 12th, Bruzual was wounded by a sniper. Defeated, he manages to flee to Curaçao where he dies on 14 August after dying of gangrene. In Willemstad he is sent to be buried by Falcón in a common grave without honors, accompanied by a Mason brother. In 1876 General Antonio Guzmán Blanco ordered the transfer of his remains to Venezuela to be buried in the National Pantheon, appointing a commission chaired by his relative Blas Bruzual.

See also 

 Federal War
 History of Venezuela
 Caudillismo

Bibliography 

 Domingo Irwin G. & Ingrid Micett (2008). Caudillos, Militares y Poder: Una Historia Del Pretorianismo en Venezuela. Caracas: Universidad Católica Andrés Bello. .

References 

Wars involving Venezuela
1860s in Venezuela